WHAK (960 AM) is a radio station airing a news-talk format, licensed to Rogers City, Michigan. The station is owned by John Yob, through licensee Mitten News LLC, and is part of a simulcast with 1110 WJML in Petoskey, Michigan, WJNL 1210 in Kingsley, Michigan, WWMN 106.3 in Thompsonville, Michigan, and WYPV 94.5 in Mackinaw City, Michigan.

History
The station began broadcasting in May 1949, and originally ran 1,000 watts, during daytime hours only. The station's power was increased to 5,000 watts in 1953. The station aired a MOR format in the 1970s and 1980s. By 1990, the station had begun airing a country music format. In 1997, the station began to simulcast 99.9 WHAK-FM, airing country music programming from Westwood One. In 1999, 99.9 WHAK adopted an oldies format, ending the simulcast.

The station was taken silent in October 2000. In October 2001, the station returned to the air, airing a talk radio format as a full-time affiliate of the Michigan Talk Radio Network. In 2005, the station began airing a country music format, as "Thunder Country", simulcasting 100.7 WWTH in Oscoda, Michigan. When WWTH adopted a classic rock format in 2012, WHAK began airing a classic hits format, simulcasting 99.9 WHAK-FM. By 2016, the station had adopted a conservative talk format, as "Your Patriot Voice".

References

External links
WHAK's website

News and talk radio stations in the United States
HAK
Radio stations established in 1949
1949 establishments in Michigan